This is a list of notable events in Latin music (i.e. music from the Spanish- and Portuguese-speaking areas Latin America, Europe, and the United States) that took place in 1997.

Events 
February 26 – The 39th Annual Grammy Awards are held at the Madison Square Garden in New York City.
Enrique Iglesias wins the Grammy Award for Best Latin Pop Performance for his self-titled album.
Rubén Blades wins the Grammy Award for Best Tropical Latin Performance for his album La Rosa de los Vientos.
La Mafia wins the Grammy Award for Best Mexican-American/Tejano Music Performance for their album Un Millón de Rosas.
Paquito D'Rivera wins the Grammy Award for Best Latin Jazz Performance for his album Portraits of Cuba.
April 28–30 – The 8th annual Billboard Latin Music Conference is held in Miami, Florida.
The 4th Annual Billboard Latin Music Awards are also held and Colombian singer Shakira becomes the biggest winner with three wins. Mexican singer José José is inducted into the Billboard Latin Music Hall of Fame.
May 8 – The 9th Annual Lo Nuestro Awards are held at the James L. Knight Center in Miami, Florida. Spanish singer Enrique Iglesias is the biggest winner with three awards.
June 21 – The National Academy of Recording Arts and Sciences (NARAS) announces the creation of the Latin Academy of Recording Arts & Sciences (LARAS). The organization was created to expand NARAS's operations in Latin America and Spain. Mauricio Abaroa is appointed as the executive director of LARAS. 
September 5 – Spanish singer-songwriter Alejandro Sanz releases his fifth studio album Más. The album would go on to become the bestselling album of all-time in Spain.
September 10SESAC launches its own Latin Music Awards to honor Latin songwriters signed under the publisher.

Bands formed 
Frankie Negrón (salsa)
Jordi (Latin pop)

Bands reformed

Bands disbanded

Bands on hiatus

Number-ones albums and singles by country 
List of number-one albums of 1997 (Spain)
List of number-one singles of 1997 (Spain)
List of number-one Billboard Top Latin Albums of 1997
List of number-one Billboard Hot Latin Tracks of 1997

Awards 
1997 Premio Lo Nuestro
1997 Billboard Latin Music Awards
1997 Tejano Music Awards

Albums released

First quarter

January

February

March

Second quarter

April

May

June

Third quarter

July

August

September

Fourth quarter

October

November

December

Unknown

Best-selling records

Best-selling albums
The following is a list of the top 10 best-selling Latin albums in the United States in 1997, according to Billboard.

Best-performing songs
The following is a list of the top 10 best-performing Latin songs in the United States in 1997, according to Billboard.

Births 
March 2Becky G, American Latin pop singer
March 21 – Martina Stoessel, Argentine actress, model, singer, and dancer
August 7Evaluna Montaner, Venezuelan entertainer and singer

Deaths 
January 22 — Cornelio Reyna, 56, Mexican norteño singer
February 2 — Chico Science, 30, Brazilian singer and composer and one of the founders of the manguebeat cultural movement
August 17 — Alberto Morán, 75,  Argentine tango musician
October 24 — Luis Aguilar, 79,  Mexican film and television actor and singer of the Golden Age of Mexican cinema
October 25 — , 73, Argentine tango composer and pianist

References 

 
Latin music by year